Bettystown, previously known as Betaghstown and transliterated to Beattystown/Bettystown, is a village in an area known as East Meath within County Meath, Ireland.  Together with the neighbouring villages of Laytown and Mornington it comprises the census town of Laytown-Bettystown-Mornington with a combined population of 10,889 at the 2011 Census and 11,872 (with Donacarney) at the 2016 Census. During the Celtic Tiger, with increasing property prices in Dublin, Bettystown expanded to cater for large numbers of commuters to Dublin. The area was well known before that as a spot for Dublin summer holiday visitors, with a number of caravan parks and seaside amusements. 

In 2007, it was announced that in revisions to Dáil Constituency boundaries for 2012, Bettystown and Laytown as far as the River Nanny would be ceded from the three-seat constituency of Meath East to the five-seat constituency of Louth.

Transport
The Dublin and Drogheda Railway line opened on 25 May 1844 with a station at Bettystown. However, this station was to close soon after in November 1847 and since then the village has been served by Laytown railway station also opened on the Dublin and Drogheda Railway line on 25 May 1844 (renamed as Laytown & Bettystown in 1913). Bus Éireann route D1 provides service between Laytown and Drogheda via Bettystown.

Education
There are two primary schools in Laytown/Bettystown which follow a Catholic ethos. They are Scoil Oilibhéir Naofa (opened in 2005) and Scoil an Spioraid Naomh Senior School.

There are also two multi-denominational schools outside the town that service East Meath and South Drogheda. They are Le Cheile Educate Together National School and Gaelscoil an Bhradain Feasa. Le Cheile Educate Together National School is sited on grounds provided by another South Drogheda school, Drogheda Grammar.

A secondary school, Coláiste na hInse, was established in 2008.

Recreation 
Leisure facilities in the Bettystown area include Funtasia, an amusement park, a tennis club and a golf course. Funtasia is an indoor family fun center, with bowling, pool and 'fairground' rides.

Laytown & Bettystown Golf Club celebrated 100 years in 2009. Several club members have been capped for Ireland.

Ireland held the European Land Sailing championships in September 2017 on Bettystown beach. Over 100 European sailors competed over this 5 day period of competitions.

Bettystown beach has been host to the annual National Sandcastle and Sand Sculpturing competition in Ireland since 2003.

Archaeology
In 1850 the Tara Brooch was found on the beach at Bettystown. The Tara Brooch is now on display in the National Museum of Ireland in Dublin.

See also
 List of towns and villages in Ireland

References

External links

 Meath Tourism, for information on Accommodation, Heritage, Things to Do, Angling, Horse Racing and Maps

Towns and villages in County Meath
Beaches of County Meath